George Walker may refer to:

Arts and letters 
George Walker (chess player) (1803–1879), English chess player and writer
George Walker (composer) (1922–2018), American composer
George Walker (illustrator) (1781–1856), author of The Costume of Yorkshire
George Walker (novelist) (1772–1847), English gothic novelist
George Walker (printmaker) (born 1960), Canadian writer, artist and printmaker
George Walker (privateer) (died 1777), British privateer
George Walker (professor) (1942–2022), author on physical chemistry and education, director general of the IBO
George Walker (Puritan) (1581–1651), English clergyman
George Walker (vaudeville) (1873–1911), American vaudeville singer, partner of Bert Williams
Benjamin Walker (author) (George Benjamin Walker, 1913–2013), author on religion and philosophy, and authority on esoterica
George F. Walker (born 1947), Canadian playwright and screenwriter
George P. L. Walker (1926–2005), volcanologist
George T. Walker (1913–2011), president of the University of Louisiana at Monroe, 1958–1976

Business 
George Alfred Walker (1929–2011), British businessman, founder of Brent Walker
George Herbert Walker (1875–1953), American businessman, grandfather of George Herbert Walker Bush
George Herbert Walker Jr. (1905–1977), co-founder of the New York Mets baseball team
George Herbert Walker IV (born 1969), chairman and chief executive officer, Neuberger Berman
George Paterson Walker (1864–1926), oldest son of whisky maker Alexander Walker
George Walker (CPR president), president of the Canadian Pacific Railway

Politics and military 
Sir George Walker, 1st Baronet (1764–1842), British general, of the Forestier-Walker baronets
George Walker (attorney) (1824–1888), Massachusetts state congressman, banker, corporate executive, political adviser, advocate for bimetallism and U.S. Consul-General in Paris
George Walker (Kentucky politician) (1763–1819), U.S. senator from Kentucky
George Walker (soldier) (c. 1645–1690), clergyman and English colonel in Ireland
George Gustavus Walker (1831–1897), British Conservative Member of Parliament
George Walker (MP for Rossendale) (1874–1954), British Member of Parliament for Rossendale, 1945–1950
George Herbert Walker III (1931–2020), American businessman, US ambassador to Hungary
George J. Walker (1934–2005), U.S. general, military intelligence

Sport 
George Walker (Australian footballer) (1894–1973), Australian rules footballer
George Walker (1880s pitcher) (1863–?), former Major League Baseball player from Canada
George Walker (cricketer, born 1919) (1919–1995), English cricketer
George Walker (cricketer, born 1984), English cricketer
George Walker (footballer, born 1877) (1877–1930), English football full-back with Crystal Palace
George Walker (footballer, born 1909) (1909–?), Scottish international footballer
George Walker (footballer, born 1934) (1934–2012), English football inside forward with Bristol City and Carlisle United
George Walker (1930s pitcher) (1915–1967), American Negro leagues baseball player
George Walker (wrestler), Canadian wrestler
George Glossop Walker (1860–1908), English cricketer
George R. Walker, American football and basketball coach
George Croxton Walker, British military officer

Others 
George Walker (mathematician) (c. 1730–1807), English Dissenter and mathematician
George H. Walker (1811–1866), helped found Milwaukee, Wisconsin
George W. Walker (1896–1993), automotive industrial designer
George Washington Walker (1800–1859), missionary for the church called Religious Society of Friends, or Quakers
Sir George Casson Walker, British administrator in the Indian Civil Service
George Walker (South Africa), one of the alleged discoverers of the main gold reef on the Witwatersrand
George Walker, member of Ken Kesey's Merry Pranksters and first husband of Carolyn Garcia